The Governorate of New Andalusia was a Spanish colonial entity in what today constitutes the Caribbean coastal territories from Central America, Colombia and Venezuela, and the islands of what today are Jamaica, Cuba, Haiti, Dominican Republic and Puerto Rico. The Government of Nueva Andalucia was set in Venezuela from 1501 to 1513.

History
In 1501, Alonso de Ojeda colonized the mainland of present-day Venezuela, and received the Governorate of New Andalusia (Coquivacoa), between Cabo de la Vela and Isla Margarita (island). This was territory originally seen by Christopher Columbus.

On May 3, 1502 Ojeda founded the town of Santa Cruz in the Guajira Peninsula, the first Spanish colony in the future Province of Tierra Firme. The settlements were later abandoned for new explorations.

In 1509, authority was granted to Alonso de Ojeda to colonize the territories between Cabo de la Vela and the Gulf of Urabá as part of the Governorate of New Andalusia.

The Governorate of New Andalusia territories were further unified in May 1513 with the Governorate of Castilla de Oro.

See also
Colonial Venezuela
Governorate of New Andalusia (1534-1549) — in colonial Uruguay, Paraguay, Chile, Argentina, and Brazil.
New Andalusia Province, or Province of Cumaná (1537–1864) —  within the colonial Royal Audience of Santo Domingo (1526-1823), Captaincy General of Venezuela (1777–1823), and later of Gran Colombia (1819–1831), and early independent Venezuela (founded 1811).

Colonial Venezuela
Governorates of the Spanish Empire
Former colonies in South America
Spanish colonization of the Americas
States and territories established in 1501
1501 establishments in the Spanish Empire
1501 establishments in Venezuela
States and territories disestablished in 1513
1513 disestablishments in the Spanish Empire
1513 disestablishments in Venezuela